Maryam Akbari Monfared (born 14 December 1975) is a supporter of the People's Mojahedin of Iran. Three of her brothers and one of her sisters were executed during the 1988 mass executions in Iran.

Arrest and Prison

Monfared was arrested on 31 December 2009 and was forcibly disappeared for five months. She was detained in solitary confinement for the first 43 days of her imprisonment, and interviewed without access to a lawyer. The lawyer assigned to her by the Iranian government only met and spoke to her during the trial, which consisted of a single hearing of less than one hour. She was sentenced to 15 years in prison by the Branch 15 Revolutionary Court in Tehran in May 2010, which condemned her for "enmity against God" (moharebeh).  The UN Working Group on Forced or Involuntary Disappearances called on Iran to investigate the disappeared relatives of Maryam Akbari Monfared  to find out their fate.

She has three daughters, her youngest was a just toddler when she was imprisoned. She has been named a prisoner of conscience by Amnesty International as her conviction is solely based on an arbitrary interference with her privacy, family and correspondence. Akbari Monfared, despite serving a decade in prison, has not been allowed a single day of furlough so far, and she has not been allowed to attend the weddings nor funerals of her relatives. She has faced discrimination in prison from the prison guards and at times refused medical treatment.

International calls

Even while detained, Maryam campaigns and raises her voice by publishing open letters about prison conditions for women. Also while in prison, she filed a formal complaint demanding truth and justice for her siblings and several thousand political prisoners who were victims of extrajudicial executions in 1988. As a result, she has been threatened with an extended prison sentence and denied medical care.

On October 10, 2018, she and three other prisoners, Golrokh Ebrahimi Iraee and Atena Daemi wrote a letter addressed to the United Nations Special Rapporteur Javaid Rehman, asking him to come to Iran to witness violations of human rights occurring in the country in person.

See also 

 Human rights in the Islamic Republic of Iran
 Human Rights Activists in Iran

References

Living people
Iranian human rights activists
Women human rights activists
Year of birth missing (living people)